Doʻstlik is a city in Jizzakh Region, Uzbekistan. It is the administrative center of Doʻstlik District. The town population was 11,903 people in 1989, and 18,300 in 2016.

References

Populated places in Jizzakh Region
Cities in Uzbekistan